The 1998 Guardian Direct Cup was a men's tennis tournament played on indoor carpet courts at the Battersea Park in London, Great Britain, that was part of the Championship Series of the 1998 ATP Tour. It was the 21st edition of the tournament, the first one held in London, England, and was held from 23 February until 1 March 1988. Third-seeded Yevgeny Kafelnikov won the singles title.

Finals

Singles

  Yevgeny Kafelnikov defeated  Cédric Pioline, 7–5, 6–4
 It was Kafelnikov's 1st singles title of the year and the 15th of his career.

Doubles

  Martin Damm /  Jim Grabb defeated  Yevgeny Kafelnikov /  Daniel Vacek, 6–4, 7–5

References

External links
 ITF tournament edition details

Guardian Direct Cup
Milan Indoor
Guardian Direct Cup
Guardian Direct Cup
Guardian Direct Cup
1998 in English tennis
Tennis in London
Tennis tournaments in England